The Great Impersonation may refer to:

 The Great Impersonation (novel), a 1920 novel by the British writer E. Phillips Oppenheim
 The Great Impersonation (1921 film), an American silent film adaptation
 The Great Impersonation (1935 film), an American film adaptation
 The Great Impersonation (1942 film), an American film adaptation